This is a summary of the electoral history of Alfred Hindmarsh, Leader of the Labour Party (1916–18) and Member of Parliament for Wellington South (1911–18).

Parliamentary elections

1905 election

1911 election

1914 election

Local elections

1911 local elections

1913 local elections

1915 local elections

1917 local elections

Notes

Hindmarsh, Alfred